The 2018–19 season is Ergotelis' 89th season in existence and 12th overall in the Football League, the second tier of the Greek football league system. It is the second consecutive season of the club in the competition since the club's latest promotion from the Gamma Ethniki. The club also participates in the Greek Cup, entering the competition in the Third Round. The contents of this article cover club activities from 1 June 2018 until 18 May 2019.

Following the departure of Takis Gonias for Wadi Degla at the end of the previous season and his replacement with Cypriot manager Nikki Papavasiliou, Ergotelis impressed with their performance in the Greek Cup, where they managed to advance to the Round of 16 despite being drawn in the same group with Super League powerhouses PAOK and Aris. They went on to eliminate local Super League rival OFI in the knock-out phase to eventually make it to the quarter-finals for the first time since 1986, matching the club's best-ever performance in the competition.

Players

The following players have departed in mid-season

Out of team 

Note: Flags indicate national team as has been defined under FIFA eligibility rules. Players and Managers may hold more than one non-FIFA nationality.

Transfers

In

Promoted from youth system

Total spending: €0

Out 
 
Total income:  Undisclosed
Expenditure:  Undisclosed

Kit
2018−19

|
|
|Variations

|Friendlies

|
|
|

Pre-season and friendlies

Pre-season friendlies

Mid-season friendlies

Competitions

Overview 

Last updated: 5 May 2019

Football League Greece

League table

Results summary

Results by Round

Matches 

1. Matchdays 18 vs. Sparti was awarded to Ergotelis (3−0), due to Sparti fielding six foreign players at once during the match.
2. Matchdays 28 vs. Aittitos Spata was awarded to Ergotelis (3−0), due to Aittitos Spata being expelled from the League.

Greek Cup

Third Round

Matches

Group stage

Group D

Matches

Round of 16

Matches

Quarter-finals

Matches

Statistics

Squad statistics

! colspan="9" style="background:#DCDCDC; text-align:center" | Goalkeepers
|-

! colspan="9" style="background:#DCDCDC; text-align:center" | Defenders
|-

! colspan="9" style="background:#DCDCDC; text-align:center" | Midfielders
|-

! colspan="9" style="background:#DCDCDC; text-align:center" | Forwards
|-

! colspan="9" style="background:#DCDCDC; text-align:center" | Players transferred/loaned out during the season
|-

|-
|}

Goal scorers

1. Goal scored vs. Sparti, match was awarded to Ergotelis (3−0), due to Sparti fielding six foreign players at once during the match.

Last updated: 5 May 2019
Source: Competitive matches

Disciplinary record

Last updated: 5 May 2019
Source: Competitive matches
 = Number of bookings;  = Number of sending offs after a second yellow card;  = Number of sending offs by a direct red card.

Injury record

References

Ergotelis
Ergotelis F.C. seasons